Deltaarterivirus hemfev, formerly Simian hemorrhagic fever virus or simian haemorrhagic fever virus (SHFV), is a highly pathogenic virus in monkeys. It is a positive-stranded RNA virus classified in the family Arteriviridae.  It is the only member of the subgenus Hedartevirus.

Hosts 
Patas are believed to be the natural host for the virus since about 50% of wild patas monkeys have antibodies for the virus, while antibodies are much less prevalent in other simian species such as vervets and baboons. In macaques, however, infection with this virus can result in acute severe disease with high mortality. Recently, red colobus monkeys and red-tailed guenons have been identified as natural hosts for SHFV.

In 2022, scientists cautioned about potential future spillover of SHFV.

Symptoms 
Asymptomatic infection of the virus can occur in patas monkeys, vervet monkeys, and baboons, although it is observed primarily in patas monkeys. Infection has a rapid onset with animals developing a high fever, facial edema, cyanosis, anorexia, melena, and may begin to hemorrhage at the cutaneous, subcutaneous, and retrobulbar levels. Thrombocytopenia will develop soon after. Death usually occurs within 10–15 days after symptoms appear.

References 

Arteriviridae
Hemorrhagic fevers